The title of Knight Bachelor (abbreviated eq. aur.) is the basic rank granted to a man who has been knighted by the monarch but not inducted as a member of one of the organised orders of chivalry; it is a part of the British honours system. Knights Bachelor are the most ancient sort of British knight (the rank existed during the 13th-century reign of King Henry III), but Knights Bachelor rank below knights of chivalric orders. A man who is knighted is formally addressed as "Sir [First Name] [Surname]" or "Sir [First Name]" and his wife as "Lady [Surname]".

Criteria
Knighthood is usually conferred for public service; amongst its recipients are all male judges of His Majesty's High Court of Justice in England. It is possible to be a Knight Bachelor and a junior member of an order of chivalry without being a knight of that order; this situation has become rather common, especially among those recognized for achievements in entertainment. For instance, Sir Michael Gambon, Sir Brian May, Sir Mo Farah, Sir Derek Jacobi, Sir Anthony Hopkins, Sir Elton John, Sir Michael Caine, Sir Barry Gibb and Sir Ian McKellen are Commanders of the Most Excellent Order of the British Empire (CBEs); Sir Patrick Stewart, Sir Cliff Richard, Sir Tom Jones and Sir Van Morrison are Officers of the Most Excellent Order of the British Empire (OBEs); while Sir Paul McCartney,  Sir Richard Starkey (Ringo Starr), and Sir Nick Faldo are Members of the Most Excellent Order of the British Empire (MBE). None of them would be entitled to use the honorific "Sir" by virtue of their membership of the order alone, but as they are all also Knights Bachelor, they are entitled to preface their names with that title.

Honorifics and post-nominal letters
Knights Bachelor may prefix "Sir" to their forenames and wives of Knights may prefix "Lady" to their surnames. Since recipients are not knights of an order of chivalry there are no post-nominal letters associated with the honour.

Insignia

Until 1926 Knights Bachelor had no insignia which they could wear, but in that year King George V issued a warrant authorising the wearing of a badge on all appropriate occasions by Knights Bachelor; this badge is worn on the left side of the coat or outer garment.

Upon an oval medallion of vermilion, enclosed by a scroll a cross-hilted sword belted and sheathed, pommel upwards, between two spurs, rowels upwards, the whole set about with the sword belt, all gilt. 

In 1974, Queen Elizabeth II issued a further warrant authorising the wearing on appropriate occasions of a neck badge, slightly smaller in size, and in miniature. In 1988 a new certificate of authentication, a knight's only personal documentation, was designed by the College of Arms.

Imperial Society of Knights Bachelor
The Imperial Society of Knights Bachelor was founded for the maintenance and consolidation of the Dignity of Knights Bachelor in 1908, and obtained official recognition from the Sovereign in 1912. The Society keeps records of all Knights Bachelor, in their interest.

Equivalence
There is no female counterpart to Knight Bachelor. The lowest knightly honour that can be conferred upon a woman is Dame Commander of the Most Excellent Order of the British Empire (DBE), which is one rank higher than Knight Bachelor (being the female equivalent of KBE or Knight Commander of the Most Excellent Order of the British Empire, which is the next male knightly rank above Knight Bachelor). 

Only citizens of Commonwealth realms can be created Knights Bachelor; people of other nationalities are generally made honorary KBEs.

See also
 Knight banneret
 Central Chancery of the Orders of Knighthood
 
 List of Knights Bachelor

Notes

References 
 Insignia of knights bachelor—Website of the Imperial Society of Knights Bachelor
 The UK Honours System—Website UK Government
 Debrett's

External links